The 1994–95 Serie A was won by Juventus, who finished 10 points ahead of their nearest rivals Parma and Lazio.

Two pieces of silverware were seized by Juventus, who won the Coppa Italia against Parma but were beaten by the same opponents in the final of the UEFA Cup.

Milan's fourth-place finish after three successive Serie A titles was joined with further disappointment in the UEFA Champions League, as they lost the final to Dutch champions Ajax.

The relegated Serie A sides this season were Genoa (after tie-breaker with Padova), Foggia, Reggiana and Brescia.

This was the first Serie A season to award three points for a win in the league table: Juventus coach Marcello Lippi used a very offensive 4-3-3 formation, which resulted in a record 7 losses for a champion team, but with only 4 draws the Bianconeri capitalized upon the new regulation.

Teams
Fiorentina, Bari, Brescia and Padova had been promoted from Serie B.

Number of teams by region

Personnel and Sponsoring

League table

Results

Relegation tie-breaker

Genoa relegated to 1995–96 Serie B.

Top goalscorers

See also 
 Super Formation Soccer 95: della Serie A, football video game licensed by Italian Football League and AIC (Associazione Italiana Calciatori) that featured all clubs from the Italian Serie A (SEASON 1994–95 Serie A)
 Ace Striker, football video game licensed by Italian Football League and AIC (Associazione Italiana Calciatori) that featured all clubs from the Italian Serie A (SEASON 1994–95 Serie A)

References and sources

Almanacco Illustrato del Calcio - La Storia 1898-2004, Panini Edizioni, Modena, September 2005

External links
 :it:Classifica calcio Serie A italiana 1995 - Italian version with pictures and info.
  - All results on RSSSF Website.

Serie A seasons
Italy
1994–95 in Italian football leagues